The Route du Rhum is a single person transatlantic race the 1990 race was the 4th edition and had six classes with 50 boats taking part.

Results

External links
 
 Official You Tube Channel

References

Route du Rhum
1990 in sailing
Route du Rhum
Single-handed sailing competitions
IMOCA 60 competitions